Bánh xèo is a crispy, stuffed rice pancake popular in Vietnam. The name refers to the sound (from xèo – 'sizzling') the rice batter makes when it is poured into the hot skillet. It is a savoury fried pancake made of rice flour, water, and turmeric powder. It can also be called a Vietnamese crêpe. Some common stuffings include pork, prawns, diced green onion, mung bean, and bean sprouts. Bánh xèo is also served with lettuce, mint, Asian basil, and fish mint.

The dish is also popular in Cambodian cuisine, where the dish is called banh chao. Cambodian banh chhev are more similar to the southern Vietnamese style of bánh xèo rather than to the style present in Central Vietnam. 
 
There is also a Thai version of bánh xèo called Khanom bueang Yuan. It is offered by some street vendors and is available at many Bangkok restaurants serving Thai or royal cuisine. The most common filling in Thailand is a minced mixture of shredded coconut, roasted peanuts, shrimp, salted radish and fried tofu and served with bean sprouts and sweet cucumber relish.

See also

 Bánh cuốn
 Cong you bing
 Crêpe
 Jianbing
 Okonomiyaki
Paratha
Roti canai
 Scallion pancake
 Taco

References

External links

Vietnamese rice dishes
Cambodian cuisine
Thai cuisine
Stuffed dishes
Street food in Vietnam
Bánh
Pancakes